The Walkman A810 series is a portable media player designed by Sony. It was a flagship model in the Walkman digital player family. The model debuted in Asia in 2007, and then became available in North America. This series updates the previous Walkman A800 of the Walkman A Series, with the same hardware but different on-PC music management program.

Sony released 3 models, the NWZ-A815 (2 GB), NWZ-A816 (4 GB) and NWZ-A818 (8 GB). Some of the enhancements made include compatibility with Windows Media Player 11, and the infamous Drag n' Drop feature, which allowed the user to transfer Music, Photo and Video files quickly, via windows explorer, (using ID-Tags for the song information i.e. album, artist etc.). Sony also removed compatibility with ATRAC which replaced the customers need for SonicStage, with Windows Media Player 11.

In March 2008, Sony launched its successor in United States, the A820, featuring wireless functions and with larger display and memory.

Design

This player shares same hardware and design with Sony NW-A800. The whole body is encased with metal, and has a 2.0" LCD display. The three control buttons below  display are specially arranged to make up the Walkman logo in the front. Additionally, there is a chrome-like strip made of polished metal surrounding the device. Overall, the design is in a similar style with Sony's preceding Walkman A series model, NW-A1000/3000, which did not come to sale in United States. Both of them feature a surrounding metal strip and deliberately arranged control buttons to mimic Walkman logo. The available colors for the NW-A810/800 model are black, white, purple and pink in Japan.

Operation
Navigation is handled via three circular controls on the front of the player: a power/option key, a back/home button, and a four-way control pad surrounding a central play/pause key.A dedicated volume rocker sits on the right edge of the player.
The user interface is composed of nine icons organized in a 3X3 square. Icons Are highlighted and magnified as the user scrolls through them. The operation system offers a searching function, letting user search for a song based on artist, album, release year and genre.

Performance

The NW-A810/800 MP3 players have been critically praised for their audio quality, mostly due to its patented Sony technologies such as DSEE (Digital Sound Enhancement Engine) and Clear Stereo. DSEE is claimed to restore higher sound frequency lost when creating compressed MP3 files, to reproduce the CD audio quality.As well, the MDR-EX082 headphones bundled with the NW-A810 have a high bass response for headphones of its size. It's also tested to have higher-than-average battery life, with 36 hours of audio play and 8 hours of video play.

Reception
Walkman NW-A810 received great acclaim from CNET, which gave the gadget the Editor's Choice Award with a score of 8.0 out of 10, and was rated as "excellent".
CNET praised it for its slim design with an ample screen, extraordinary sound quality and fantastic battery life, but criticized its short earphone cable and the placement of the hold button on the back of the player.
Crave, the CNET gadget blog, named the NW-A810 series as one of the MP3 players that shaped year 2007, with another three, the Zune 80, iPod Touch, and the ZEN.

Differences with Walkman NW-A800

Hardware-wise, NW-A800 and NW-A810 are identical. The main difference laid on the firmware which affect audio format support and music management software. Unless mentioned specifically above, the rest of specification is exactly the same for both devices.

See also
Walkman
Sony
Sony Connect
Sony Ericsson
Adaptive Transform Acoustic Coding

References

External links
CNET Reviews on NW-A810
Walkman at SonyStyle USA
Official Walkman Website in Japan 

Walkman
Sony products
Digital audio players
Portable media players